For information on all Providence College sports, see Providence Friars
The Providence Friars football program was the intercollegiate American football team for Providence College located in Providence, Rhode Island. The school's first football team was fielded in 1921. The program was discontinued by the college in December 1941.

Notable former players
 Bill Connor — Guard, Tackle — 1929 Boston Bulldogs and 1930 Newark Tornadoes
 Jack Triggs — 1926 Providence Steam Roller
 Fred Dagata — 1931 Providence Steam Roller
 Hank Soar — Running back, defensive back — 1937-1946 New York Giants
 Chuck Avedisian — Guard — 1942-1944 New York Giants

References

 
American football teams established in 1921
American football teams disestablished in 1941
1921 establishments in Rhode Island
1941 disestablishments in Rhode Island